Larry Scott (born November 21, 1964) is an American sports administrator and former professional tennis player who was the commissioner of the collegiate Pac-12 Conference until 2021. He has also served as chairman and CEO of the Women's Tennis Association and as president and COO of ATP Properties, a division of the Association of Tennis Professionals.

Early life and education
Scott was born in New York City. A speaker of French, Scott graduated in 1986 from Harvard University with a B.A. in European History. While at Harvard, he was captain of the tennis team and named an All-American.

Professional tennis player
As a professional tennis player, Scott reached a career-high singles ranking of No. 210 and doubles ranking of No. 69 in the world. He also won one doubles title.

ATP Properties
Following his retirement as a pro tennis player, Scott spent a decade serving as president and COO of ATP Properties, a division of the Association of Tennis Professionals.

During his time in ATP management, Scott put together a lucrative partnership between the ATP and the Swiss marketing company ISL.

Women's Tennis Association
Scott became chairman and CEO of the Women's Tennis Association on April 16, 2003.

While at the WTA, Scott oversaw a fivefold increase in sponsorship money and a 250% increase in total revenue. This included the largest sponsorship in the history of women's athletics, a six-year, $88-million deal with Sony Ericsson. Scott also successfully formed sponsorships with Whirlpool, Gatorade, and Bed Bath & Beyond.

Prize money increased 40% during Scott's time with the WTA. Scott was an advocate for equal pay. Before Scott's tenure, two of the four Grand Slam tournaments, Wimbledon and the French Open, awarded less prize money to women than to men. Scott successfully lobbied for the increase of women's prize money at Wimbledon and the French Open to be equal to that of men's prize money, so that men's and women's prize money are now equal at all Grand Slam events.

Among Scott's other achievements was the securing of a contract with Eurosport to broadcast WTA tennis in 54 countries. Scott also oversaw new investments of $710 million in tennis stadiums.

In February 2009, Israeli tennis player Shahar Pe'er was denied a visa, on the basis of her nationality, by the United Arab Emirates. Consequently, she was unable to play in the 2009 Dubai Tennis Championships. For this, Scott had the WTA levy a $300,000 fine against the tournament organizers.

Pac-12 Conference
On March 24, 2009, Scott announced that he was resigning as chairman and CEO of the Women's Tennis Association in order to take up a new position as the commissioner of the collegiate Pacific-10 Conference on July 1, 2009. He succeeded the retiring Tom Hansen.

On February 9, 2010, Scott announced that the Pac-10 would be considering expanding to twelve schools. The Pac-10 Conference officially became the Pac-12 Conference following the addition of Colorado and Utah on July 1, 2011.

Under Scott, the conference formed a $3 billion broadcasting contract with ESPN and Fox Sports to create the Pac-12 Networks. The inaugural Pac-12 Football Championship Game took place in Eugene, Oregon on December 2, 2011.

References

External links
 Biography on WTA Tour website
 
 
 

1964 births
Living people
American male tennis players
American chief executives of professional sports organizations
Harvard Crimson men's tennis players
Pac-12 Conference commissioners
Sportspeople from New York City
Tennis people from New York (state)
WTA Tour
American chief operating officers